Amos Louis Mazzant III (born February 22, 1965) is a United States district judge of the United States District Court for the Eastern District of Texas and former United States magistrate judge of the same court.

Biography
Mazzant was born in Ellwood City, Pennsylvania. He received a Bachelor of Arts degree, magna cum laude, in 1987 from the University of Pittsburgh. He received a Juris Doctor in 1990 from the Baylor Law School.

Mazzant began his legal career as a law clerk for Judge Paul Neeley Brown of the United States District Court for the Eastern District of Texas from 1990 to 1992. From 1992 to 1993, he worked at the law firm of Henderson, Bryant & Wolfe. He served as a law clerk to Magistrate Judge Robert Faulkner from 1993 to 2003 and Magistrate Judge Don D. Bush in 2003, both in the Eastern District of Texas. From 2003 to 2004, he was of counsel at Wolfe, Tidwell & McCoy, LLP. He served as a justice of the Court of Appeals for the Fifth District of Texas at Dallas, from 2004 to 2009. From 2009 to 2014, he served as a United States magistrate judge in the Eastern District of Texas.

Federal judicial service
On June 26, 2014, President Barack Obama nominated Mazzant to serve as a United States District Judge of the United States District Court for the Eastern District of Texas, to the seat vacated by Judge T. John Ward, who retired on October 1, 2011. He received a hearing before the United States Senate Committee on the Judiciary for September 9, 2014. On November 20, 2014 his nomination was reported out of committee by voice vote. On Saturday, December 13, 2014 Senate Majority Leader Harry Reid filed a motion to invoke cloture on the nomination. On December 16, 2014, Reid withdrew his cloture motion on Mazzant's nomination, and the Senate proceeded to vote to confirm Mazzant in a voice vote.  He received his federal judicial commission on December 19, 2014.

Notable cases

On October 7, 2016, Judge Mazzant conditionally dismissed securities fraud charges filed by the United States Securities and Exchange Commission against Texas Attorney General Ken Paxton.

On November 22, 2016, Judge Mazzant issued a nationwide injunction blocking a regulation by President Barack Obama attempting to adjust the maximum salary where overtime is required, which had not been raised in decades.

In 2016, a class action lawsuit was filed against Adeptus Health (as well as members of the Company’s board of directors, Sterling Partners, and the joint book-running managers in the Company’s secondary public offering of shares of its Class A common stock) by purchasers of its securities alleging that the company violated the federal securities laws and made false and/or misleading statements, failing to disclose its internal control over financial reporting and the overall status of its business operations. The case is Oklahoma Law Enforcement Retirement System v. Adeptus Health Inc., before Judge Mazzant, and is under Sections 11, 12(a)(2), and 15 of the Securities Act of 1933, as well as Section 10(b) and 20(a) of the Securities Exchange Act of 1934.

References

External links

1965 births
Living people
Baylor Law School alumni
Judges of the United States District Court for the Eastern District of Texas
People from Ellwood City, Pennsylvania
Texas state court judges
United States district court judges appointed by Barack Obama
21st-century American judges
United States magistrate judges
University of Pittsburgh alumni